Olga Ivanova (born 15 October 1984, in Narva) is an Estonian politician, a member of the Estonian Centre Party. She was chosen to the Estonian Parliament in the 2015 election with 1,948 personal votes. Ivanova has worked as Lasnamäe district elder since 2011.

See also

References

1984 births
Living people
Politicians from Narva
Members of the Riigikogu, 2015–2019
Estonian Centre Party politicians
Estonian people of Russian descent
Women members of the Riigikogu
21st-century Estonian politicians
21st-century Estonian women politicians